Abdul Karim Joumaa (born 29 March 1954) is a Syrian middle-distance runner. He competed in the men's 3000 metres steeplechase at the 1980 Summer Olympics.

References

1954 births
Living people
Athletes (track and field) at the 1980 Summer Olympics
Syrian male middle-distance runners
Syrian male steeplechase runners
Olympic athletes of Syria
Place of birth missing (living people)
20th-century Syrian people